In Christian theology, the tripartite view (trichotomy) holds that humankind is a composite of three distinct components: body, spirit, and soul. It is in contrast to the bipartite view (dichotomy), where soul and spirit are taken as different terms for the same entity (the spiritual soul).

Scriptural basis
The primary proof texts for this position are as follows:

 "Then the LORD God formed man of the dust of the ground, and breathed into his nostrils the breath of life; and man became a living soul." (JPS Tanakh)

Trichotomists see in Genesis 2:7 the first implications of the constituents of man's nature. Delitzsch, commenting on this passage, says, "We cannot consider with sufficient care Gen. 2:7; for this one verse is of such deep significance that interpretation can never exhaust it: it is the foundation of all true anthropology and psychology." John Bickford Heard refers to Genesis 2:7 as a revelation of the material cause, the formal or efficient cause, and the final cause of man's threefold nature. The material cause—the Lord God formed man from the dust of the ground. The formal or efficient cause—God breathed into his nostrils the breath (neshamah) of life. The final cause—man became a living soul (nephesh). The question is whether Genesis 2:7 refers to two or to three distinct facts and thus whether Genesis 2:7 describes two or three distinct parts of man's constitution. Trichotomists believe that God's breath of life, when breathed into man's body of dust, became man's human spirit. Proverbs 20:27 uses the same Hebrew word (neshamah) for the spirit of man, indicating that God's breathe of life and man's spirit are closely related. George Boardman describes the Divine Pneuma and the human pneuma as "constitutionally akin"  while Heard ascribes to them the same nature. For Michael Schmaus and most trichotomists, the human spirit is the focal point of the image of God.

 "And the God of peace himself sanctify you wholly; and may your spirit and soul and body be preserved entire, without blame at the coming of our Lord Jesus Christ." (ASV)

Proponents of the tripartite view claim that this verse spells out clearly the three components of the human, emphasized by the descriptors of "whole" and "completely". Opponents argue that spirit and soul are merely a repetition of synonyms, a common form used elsewhere in scripture to add the idea completeness.

    
 12 Now we have received, not the spirit of the world, but the Spirit who is from God, that we might know the things freely given to us by God, 13 which things we also speak, not in words taught by human wisdom, but in those taught by the Spirit, bringing together spiritual (men, pneumatikois) with spiritual (things, pneumatikà). 14 But the soulish man (psychikós) does not accept the things of the Spirit of God; for they are foolishness to him, and he cannot understand them, because they are spiritually appraised. 15 But the spiritual man (ho pneumatikòs) appraises all things, yet he himself is appraised by no man. 16 For "who has known the mind of the Lord, that he should instruct Him?" But we have the mind of Christ.
3:1 And I, brothers, could not speak to you as to spiritual men (pneumatikois), but as to carnal men (sarkínois), as to infants in Christ. 2 (I gave you) milk to drink, not solid food, for you were not yet able (to receive it), for even now you are not yet able, 3 for you are still carnal (sarkikoí). For since there is jealousy and strife among you, are you not carnal (sarkikoí), and are you not walking like mere men? 4 For when someone says on the one hand, “I am of Paul,” but another, “I am of Apollos,” are you (acting like) men?

In this passage, the Apostle Paul divides men into three categories based on their responses to apostolic teaching: those who are spiritual (pneumatikos, 2.13, 15; 3.1), those who are soulish (psychikós; 2.14) and the Corinthians who are carnal (sarkivós; 3.1, 3). Each is driven or controlled by some aspect of their being, whether the spirit, the soul or the flesh. If the spirit and soul are identical, Paul's argument is meaningless.

 "For the word of God is alive and active. Sharper than any double-edged sword, it penetrates even to dividing soul and spirit, joints and marrow; it judges the thoughts and attitudes of the heart." (NIV)

Proponents of the tripartite view claim that this verse spells out that there is a clear difference between soul and spirit, though they may be so intertwined and similar that they would be hard to separate without scriptural clarity. Opponents argue that there is no real separation here (though there must be some difference, at least in emphasis, if two different words are used), but the two are only used as a metaphor of things hard to differentiate, like the thoughts and intentions of the heart.

 " in whom ye were also circumcised with a circumcision not made with hands, in the putting off of the body of the flesh, in the circumcision of Christ;"
Before salvation, the soul was stuck to the body.

"For I delight in the law of God after the inward man; but I see a different law in my members, warring against the law of my mind, and bringing me into captivity under the law of sin which is in my members."

After salvation, the soul is trying to follow the spirit. The spirit is known to be the new man or new nature. At the same time, it is trying not to follow the old man or old nature (body). The soul can either follow the spirit and do what’s right or follow the body and do what’s wrong.

Historical development

Old Testament

The Old Testament consistently uses three primary words to describe the parts of man: basar (flesh), which refers to the external, material aspect of man (mostly in emphasizing human frailty); nephesh, which refers to the soul as well as the whole person or life; and ruach which is used to refer to the human spirit (ruach can mean "wind", "breath", or "spirit" depending on the context; cf. Ezek. 37:1–14 where ruach is translated as all three). In the Old Testament basar occurs 266 times, nephesh occurs 754 times, and ruach occurs 378 times with at least 100 times referring to the human spirit.

According to trichotomists, the full anthropology of man and the proper distinction between his inward parts (Psa. 51:6) while latent in the Old Testament, do not receive a clear treatment until the New Testament. Genesis 2:7 "rather implies than asserts the trichotomy of spirit, soul, and body" and must be "illuminated by the light of subsequent Scriptures" to reveal its full import. This corresponds with what many theologians call progressive revelation. As with Genesis 2:7, other verses in the Old Testament directly correlate man's spirit (ruach) with God's breath (neshamah) (Job 27:3; 32:8; 33:4; 34:14). However, the revelation of the human spirit is obscure in the Old Testament, as is the revelation of the Holy Spirit or the Trinity. Not until the New Testament is the nature of God fully and explicitly revealed and likewise not until the New Testament (especially the Epistles) is the nature of man fully and explicitly revealed.

Heard explains:

We have only another caution to make before entering on our task; it is that revelation being a progressive manifestation of the truth of God, the discovery of man's nature must also be progressive. In the same way that the plurality of Persons in the Godhead, and their relation to each other, was only gradually unfolded in Scripture, so we may expect it to be with the trichotomy of man's nature, spirit, soul, and body. As in the case of the doctrine of the Trinity it was not fully understood until the Spirit was given, so the distinction of Psyche and Pneuma is implied rather than taught when the race was still in its spiritual infancy....It would be out of harmony with the “analogy of the faith,” if the tripartite nature of man were fully described in those books of the Bible which only contain implied hints of the plurality of persons in the Godhead. All we shall see of the subject will confirm this view of the harmonious way in which doctrines and duties, the nature of God and the nature of man, are unfolded together.

The relation between body and soul itself wasn't clear to the ancients, much less the relation between soul and spirit. The physiology and psychology of the Hebrew and the Archaic Greek world was speculative, and so, reasoning on imperfect data, they spoke of various physical organs as the seat of thought, feeling, and decision. The heart primarily was the seat of thought and feeling, the kidneys the seat of reflection (Psa. 16:7; 26:2; Prov. 23:6), and the bowels the seat of affection (Gen. 43:30; Phil. 1:8). It wasn't until the Alexandrian physicians (e.g. Erasistratus and Herophilus) and the Classical Greek philosophers (e.g. Plato and Aristotle) that a more accurate understanding of man's inward parts began to emerge.

Intertestamental period

During the intertestamental period, two factors shaped and "enlarged the semantic domain of the Greek and Hebrew words for the parts of man" and set the stage for a more complete and accurate understanding of the nature of man. The first factor was Greek philosophy. The Greek philosophers, unlike the Greek poets, clearly distinguished the material from the immaterial part of man, defined the functions of the soul in more precise terms, and in general expanded the vocabulary for the parts of man. The second factor was the translation of the Septuagint. The translators of the Septuagint incorporated the linguistic developments of the Greek philosophers into the biblical revelation when they translated the Hebrew into Greek.

Good explains:

Although the classical Greek writers did not arrive at the same realization as the New Testament writers, their use of certain key words in Greek gave the New Testament writers a greater and more precise vocabulary to work with in describing the parts of man. After Plato and Aristotle, there was a richer array of words to describe the inward parts of man, particularly the mind (e.g., nous, noëma, di-anoia, and phronëma).

Dichotomists often argue against the tripartite view of man by discrediting it through its apparent connection with Platonism. However, Plato and the Greek philosophers, strictly speaking, were dichotomists. Plato did divide man into three parts, but his trichotomy was different from Paul's trichotomy in essence, function, and primacy. Plato's divisions were a tripartite division of the soul (See Plato's tripartite theory of soul). He conceived of man's soul as consisting of an appetitive, irascible (spirited), and rational element. In Timaeus 30 he also divided man into nous (mind), psychë (soul), and söma (body), with nous being the noblest part of the soul. When Plato does speak of spirit (thumos not the pneuma of Paul) he means something essentially different from Paul. The three parts of man are not equivalent for Plato and Paul and the master faculty for Plato (nous) is a subordinate faculty for Paul. "To discredit trichotomy by a similarity with Platonism confuses similarity with source. One could likewise attribute the source of the dichotomist view with Greek dichotomy (mater and spirit); some writers have argued for such a connection."

New Testament

Trichotomists believe that a tripartite view of man is clearly taught throughout the New Testament (see the Scriptural Basis section above). The writers of the New Testament, like the writers of the Old Testament, consistently use three primary words to describe the components of man's nature: sarx, used 151 times (and söma about 129 times), refers to the physical aspect of humanity; psychë, used 105 times, refers to the psycho-logical aspect of humanity; and pneuma, used 385 times total in the New Testament, refers to the human spirit in approximately 80 of those instances.

In the New Testament, finer distinctions can be made between the functions and relations of man's inward parts.

A full treatment of man's nature must consider the New Testament use of such words as flesh, body, spirit, soul, heart, mind, and conscience. For instance, dichotomists often dismiss the distinction between soul and spirit in 1 Thessalonians 5:23 as a piling up of terms for emphasis, that spirit and soul is "rhetorical tautology". They claim that if 1 Thessalonians 5:23 proves that man is composed of three parts, then Mark 12:30 must prove that man is made of four parts since Jesus enumerates heart, soul, mind, strength. However, trichotomists see only three parts here based on their understanding of how the Bible uses the terms heart, soul, and mind. The heart is a composition of the soul plus the conscience, and the mind is the leading part of the soul. Thus, Mark 12:30 is well within the parameters of a tripartite view of man.

Early Church

The tripartite view of man was considered an orthodox interpretation in the first three centuries of the church and many of the early church fathers (see Supporters of a Tripartite View chart) taught that man is made up of body, soul, and spirit. Irenaeus, Tatian, Melito, Didymus of Alexandria, Justin Martyr, Clement of Alexandria, Origen, Gregory of Nyssa, and Basil of Cesaraea, all held to the distinction firmly according to its supporters.

However, there arose, primarily, three historical errors, the fear of which have caused a "prejudice against trichotomy": the pseudo-Gnostic view, the Apollinarian error, and the semi-Pelagian error. "But", Delitzsch argues, "in the face of all these errors, its opponents must confess that man may be regarded trichotomically, without in the least degree implying the adoption of such erroneous views."

Apollinarianism

In the 4th century, after Apollinaris of Laodicea employed it in a manner impinging on the perfect humanity of Jesus, the tripartite view of man was gradually discredited by association. Apart from this heretical doctrine, which was condemned at the First Council of Constantinople in A.D. 381, Apollinaris was an orthodox theologian and contemporary of Athanasius and Basil of Cesaraea.

In History of the Christian Church, Philip Schaff remarks:

Apollinaris, therefore, taught the deity of Christ, but denied the completeness (teleiotes) of his humanity, and, taking his departure from the Nicene postulate of the homoousion, ran into the Arian heresy, which likewise put the divine Logos in the place of the human spirit in Christ.

The fact that an early heresy called Apollinarism emerged is itself witness that the early church held the tripartite view of man according to Pester. This heresy taught that in Christ the human spirit was replaced by pure, divine Logos. If the early church taught that man consisted only of body and soul, this heresy never could have gained traction. Some theologians believe that Apollinaris himself, however, confused the Pauline trichotomy with the Platonic trichotomy by confounding the pneuma (ru’ah) with the nous.

Heard explains:
The Greek Fathers, generally speaking, understood the psychology of Scripture aright; but unfortunately confounding the Platonic Logos or Nous with the Pneuma of the New Testament, they either distinguished the pneumatical and psychical as the intellectual and the carnal man respectively (which was the root error of the Gnostics), or confounded in a semi-pantheistic way the human Pneuma with the divine, which, in the case of Origen and Apollinaris, led to distinct heresies, which the Church afterwards formally condemned. The consequence of this was, that in the reaction against these errors, the Latin Church generally, as guided by Augustine and Jerome, rejected altogether the distinction between Psyche and Pneuma, for which the Latin tongue was not flexible enough to find equivalents, and so the usual dichotomy of man into body and soul only became the prevailing view throughout the West.

Semipelagianism

After Apollinarianism was condemned at Constantinople in A.D. 381, another heresy tarnished the Pauline distinction of soul and spirit. The Semipelagians, after Pelagius, used the distinction to teach that "the spirit is excepted from the original sin which affected the body and soul"  and that therefore, human nature is essentially good and retains genuine freedom in the will to initiate salvation. Contrary to Pelagius' view of human nature, Augustine taught that, because of original sin, the human nature we receive at birth has been "wounded, hurt, damaged, destroyed"  and that, therefore, man is incapable of doing or desiring good apart from the sovereignty of grace. In maintaining the doctrine of original sin against the Pelagian party, Augustine ultimately held to the dichotomist conception of man and thought it safer to pass by the distinction of soul and spirit as an "unprofitable distinction".

Heard, however, argues that the distinction of soul and spirit "so far from making void the doctrine of original sin, actually confirms and explains it":

Had Augustine but recognized the trichotomy, and taught that the ruach, or pneuma, or spiritus—i.e. the inspired and Godlike part of man—was deadened by the fall, and that in that state of spiritual injury a propagation of soul and body from Adam to his posterity must ex traduce carry with it a defective, and hence a diseased constitution, his refutation of Pelagius would have been sufficiently convincing, without hurrying him into an exaggeration in the opposite extreme...

Augustine's immense influence on the history of Western Christian thought, in form and content, swayed decisively the decision for the dichotomous view of man. Heard says, "the authority of Augustine decided the course of the Western Church in rejecting the distinction as mystical, and tending to deprave the doctrine of man's fall and corruption." George S. Hendry in a chapter entitled, The Holy Spirit and the Human Spirit, concludes that "the denial of a created spirit in man, both in ancient and in modern theology, is bound up with a one-sided, Augustinian conception of grace."

Interest in the human spirit waned in the mediaeval church, "whose tendencies were scholastic rather than exegetical, and whose philosophy was thoroughly Aristotelian."

Reformation

With the Reformers, the rejection of trichotomy stems from an apparent incompatibility with their doctrine of sovereign grace, following Augustine. Since Plato, the conception of the human spirit involved an aspiration (eros) for the beautiful, good, and eternal. Early Christians similarly expressed this longing of the human spirit as a longing for the divine Spirit of God and thus established a correlation between philosophy and theology. This insatiable longing was seen as the “index of an ontological orientation of the creature toward the Creator." Augustine famously expressed this longing in his Confessions when he said, “Thou has made us for Thyself and our hearts are restless till they rest in Thee (Augustine, Confessions, p. 3.).” For Aquinas, “it is natural to ascribe the desire of the finite for the infinite to the human spirit.” Luther identifies the human spirit as “the highest, deepest, noblest part of man, by which he is able to grasp incomprehensible, invisible, and eternal things.” “It soon came to be felt, however, that such a view could not be held in conjunction with the main emphasis of the Reformation." The longing for God, even though unconscious, obscure or misinterpreted, in unregenerated man clashed with the Reformers’ understanding of total depravity. They reasoned that since man is spiritually dead, he is totally passive and cannot even aspire for God. Thus “man was to all intents and purposes ‘de-spirited’.” However, this reduced man to an inanimate object, like a stone or tree, and severely undermined man’s humanity. Man was "a kind of unfeeling and inept material that had to be moved from one place to another." The doctrine of sola gratia, under the influence of Augustine's understanding of grace, undermined human freedom by stressing that grace is not merely indispensable but irresistible. "Fundamentally, the objection was that Augustine had resolved the paradox of inevitability and responsibility at the expense of responsibility, and that he glorified grace by belittling nature and free will." Hendry, a Reformed theologian, and other trichotomists do not see any necessary conflict between man possessing a distinct, created human spirit and the sovereignty of grace, so long as "the nature of spirit and its activity be properly understood."

Among the Reformers, Luther stands out, possibly, as a major exception to the prevailing dichotomist view. Pelikan has noted that in Luther's writings there is support for the “trichotomist idea of human nature as made up of body, soul, and spirit; but there are also places in his writings which seem to speak for the dichotomist idea of man's material and nonmaterial nature as the two parts of his being." In his Biblical Psychology, Delitzsch also ascribes the trichotomous view to Luther, in an appendix entitled "Luther's Trichotomy" where he quotes at length Luther's commentary on the Magnificat.

Luther writes:

Scripture divides man into three parts, as says St Paul (1 Thess. 5:23)... And every one of these three, together with the entire man, is also divided in another way into two portions, which are there called Spirit and Flesh. Which division is not natural, but attributive; i.e. nature has three portions spirit, soul, and body... In the tabernacle fashioned by Moses there were three separate compartments. The first was called the holy of holies: here was God's dwelling place, and in it there was no light. The second was called the holy place; here stood a candle-stick with seven arms and seven lamps. The third was called the outer court; this lay under the open sky and in the full light of the sun. In this tabernacle we have a figure of the Christian man. His spirit is the holy of holies, where God dwells in the darkness of faith, where no light is; for he believes that which he neither sees nor feels nor comprehends. His soul is the holy place, with its seven lamps, that is, all manner of reason, discrimination, knowledge, and understanding of visible and bodily things. His body is the forecourt, open to all, so that men may see his works and manner of life.

Others, including John Bickford Heard, George Boardman, James Stalker, Watchman Nee, and Witness Lee have used the tabernacle to illustrate the tripartite man.

At the turn of the 19th century in Germany, there was a major resurgence of interest in the tripartite view of man (see chart). Hendry accounts the initial thrust of this resurgence to philosophical concerns. "The development of the philosophy of spirit in post-Kantian idealism, originating in Germany, may be interpreted historically as a revolt against the suppression of the spirit in Protestant theology; for it was in its initial intention an affirmation, or reaffirmation, of the human spirit."

Supporters of a tripartite view
Many of the theologians below are cited by Louis Berkhof's Systematic Theology, Augustus H. Strong's Systematic Theology, Jan Jacob van Oosterzee's Christian Dogmatics, John Bickford Heard's Tripartite Nature of Man, and Henri de Lubac's History and Spirit.

{| class="wikitable" style="border:\#c9c9c9 1px solid; margin: 1em 1em 1em 0; border-collapse: collapse;"
| align="center" style="background:#f0f0f0;"|Name
| align="center" style="background:#f0f0f0;"|Born
| align="center" style="background:#f0f0f0;"|Died
| align="center" style="background:#f0f0f0;"|Theological Tradition
| align="center" style="background:#f0f0f0;"|Major Works Supporting Trichotomy
| align="center" style="background:#f0f0f0;"|Referenced by
|-
| Justin Martyr||100||165||Early Christian apologist||On the Resurrection<ref>Justin, 'Ante-Nicene Fathers, Vol 1, p. 298. "For the body is the house of the soul; and the soul the house of the spirit." Online.</ref>||Van Oosterzee, Heard
|-
| Tatian||120||180||Early Christian apologist||Tatian's Address to the Greeks|| Van Oosterzee; A Dictionary of Early Christian Beliefs
|-
| Clement of Alexandria||150||215||Church Father||||Berkhof
|-
| Melito||?||180||Bishop of Sardis||||Van Oosterzee
|-
| Hippolytus of Rome||170||235||Presbyter of the Church in Rome||Commentary on Daniel, Book 2, Ch. 38||Henri de Lubac
|-
| Origen||184||253||Church Father||De Principiis, Book 2, On the Soul||Van Oosterzee, Berkhof, Henri De Lubac
|-
| Irenaeus||2nd century||202||Church Father||Against Heresies||Van Oosterzee
|-
| Eusebius||260/265||339/340||Roman historian & Bishop of Caesarea||Commentary on the Psalms 102, v. 20||Henri de Lubac
|-
| Apollinarius||?||390||Bishop of Laodicea in Syria||||Berkhof
|-
| Didymus of Alexandria||313||398||Coptic Church theologian||Commentary on Ecclesiastes; Commentary on the Psalms||Richard A Layton; Henri de Lubac
|-
| Basil of Caesarea||329||379||Church Father||Homily 21||Henri de Lubac
|-
| Gregory of Nazianzus||329||389/390||Church Father and Archbishop of Constantinople||Poems, bk. 1, sec. 1, 8 (On the Soul)||Henri de Lubac
|-
| Gregory of Nyssa||335||395||Church Father||On the Making of Man 8.4–6||Berkhof
|-
| John of Damascus||645/676||749||Church Father||||Strong
|-
| John Climacus||7th century||?||7th-century Christian monk||The Ladder of Divine Ascent||
|-
| Martin Luther||1483||1546||German Reformer||Commentary on the Magnificat||Delitzsch
|-
|Thomas Jackson||1579||1640||English theologian, Arminian||||
|-
| Thomas White||1593||1676||Roman Catholic priest and scholar||||
|-
| Philip Doddridge||1702||1751||English Nonconformist leader||A Paraphrase and Notes on the First Epistle of Paul the Apostle to the Thessalonians||
|-
| Magnus Friedrich Roos||1727||1803||German Lutheran theologian ||Outlines of Psychology drawn from the Holy Scriptures||Berkhof
|-
| Seraphim of Sarov||1754||1833||Russian Orthodox Theologian||St. Seraphim of Sarov's Conversation with Nicholas Motovilov||
|-
| Adam Clarke||1762||1832||British Methodist theologian||Clarke's Commentary on the Bible||
|-
| Gotthilf Heinrich von Schubert||1780||1860||German Theologian||||Van Oosterzee
|-
| Karl Friedrich Goschel||1784||1861||Prussian Right Hegelian ||Herzog, Realencyclopadie, article "Seele"||Strong
|-
| August Neander||1789||1850||German theologian and church historian||History of the Planting and Training of the Christian Church by the Apostles||Strong
|-
| Hermann Olshausen||1796||1839||German theologian||Opuscula Theologica and Commentary on 1 Thes. 5:23||Strong, Berkhof
|-
| Leonhard Usteri||1799||1833||Swiss Reformed theologian||Entwickelung Des Paulinischen Lehrbegriffes||Strong
|-
| August Friedrich Christian Vilmar||1800||1868||German Neo-Lutheran theologian|| Dogmatik: Akademische Vorlesungen || G. C. Berkouwer
|-
| Heinrich August Wilhelm Meyer||1800||1873||German Protestant theologian||Critical and Exegetical Commentary on the New Testament||
|-
| Johann Tobias Beck||1804||1878||German theologian||Outlines of Biblical Psychology||Strong, Berkhof
|-
| Henry Alford||1810||1871||Anglican theologian and scholar||New Testament for English Readers||
|-
| Frederic Charles Cook||1810||1889||English churchman and linguist||The Speaker's Commentary||
|-
| Johann Gottfried Hausmann||1811||1901||||||
|-
| Gustav Friedrich Oehler||1812||1872||German Lutheran theologian||Theology of the Old Testament||Berkhof
|-
| Søren Kierkegaard||1813||1855||Danish Lutheran||The Concept of Anxiety, The Sickness Unto Death, Johannes Climacus, or De omnibus dubitandum est. A Narrative||
|-
| Franz Delitzsch||1813||1890||German Lutheran theologian||Biblical Psychology||Berkhof
|-
| William Smith||1813||1893||English Lexicographer||Smith's Bible Dictionary||
|-
| Theophan the Recluse||1815||1894||Russian Orthodox Theologian||The Spiritual Life||
|-
| Jan Jacob van Oosterzee||1817||1882||Dutch Divine||Christian Dogmatics||Strong
|-
| Charles John Ellicott||1819||1905||Anglican theologian||Destiny of the Creature||Strong
|-
| A. R. Fausset||1821||1910||Anglican theologian||Jamieson-Fausset-Brown Bible Commentary||
|-
| Karl August Auberlen||1824||1864||German Lutheran theologian||Geist des Menschen im Biblischen Sinne||Strong, Berkhof
|-
| George Boardman the Younger||1828||1903||Baptist||"The Scriptural Anthropology." Baptist Quarterly Vol. 1||Strong
|-
| Andrew Murray||1828||1917||Dutch Reformed Church||The Spirit of Christ||
|-
| John Bickford Heard||1828||?||||The Tripartite Nature of Man||Strong, Berkhof
|-
| Henry Liddon||1829||1890||English Theologian||||John Laidlaw
|-
| Hermann Cremer||1834||1903||German Protestant theologian||Biblico-theological Lexicon of New Testament Greek||Strong
|-
| C. I. Scofield||1843||1921||American Theologian||Scofield Reference Bible||
|-
| G. H. Pember||1837||1910||Plymouth Brethren||Earth's Earliest Ages||
|-
| Otto Stockmayer||1838||1917||German Holiness Movement||||Watchman Nee in Spiritual Man
|-
| F. B. Meyer||1847||1929||English Baptist pastor and evangelist||||Watchman Nee in Spiritual Man & Latent Power of the Soul
|-
| James M Stalker||1848||1929||Scottish preacher||Christian Psychology||
|-
| Clarence Larkin||1850||1924||Protestant (Baptist)||Dispensational Truth or God's Plan and Purpose in the Ages||
|-
| Jessie Penn-Lewis||1861||1927||Protestant (Welsh)||Soul and Spirit, War on the Saints||
|-
| Mary E. McDonough||1863||1962||||God's Plan of Redemption||
|-
| Lewis Sperry Chafer||1871||1952||American Protestant Theologiian||Systematic Theology Vol. 1&2||Gordon R. Lewis and Bruce A. Demarest in Integrative Theology
|-
| George H. Lang||1874||1958||Plymouth Brethren||Firstfruits and Harvest||
|-
| Evan Roberts||1878||1951||Welsh Calvinist Methodist||War on The Saints||
|-
| Robert Lightfoot||1883||1953||Anglican Priest and Theologian||||John Laidlaw
|-
| William Theodore Heard||1884||1973||Cardinal in the Roman Catholic Church||||
|-
| Arthur W. Pink||1886||1952||Reformed||The Great Change, Regeneration, Or, The New Birth, Gleanings in Genesis||
|-
| Herbert Lockyer||1886||1984||||All the Doctrines of the Bible||John Woodward
|-
| Theodore Austin-Sparks||1888||1971||British Christian evangelist||What is Man?||John Woodward
|-
| Ruth Paxson||1889||1949||Protestant ||Life on the Highest Plane||
|-
| Watchman Nee||1903||1972||Chinese Christian Preacher||The Spiritual Man, The Release of the Spirit||
|-
| George S. Hendry||1904||1993||Reformed Theologian||The Holy Spirit in Christian Theology||
|-
| Witness Lee||1905||1997||Chinese Christian Preacher||The Economy of God||
|-
| E.C.Bragg||1912||1995||American Evangelical Theologian||||
|-
| Lehman Strauss||?||1997||Baptist||Man A Trinity (Spirit, Soul, Body)||
|-
| Mark G Cambron||1911||2000||||Bible Doctrines||John Woodward
|-
| Lester Sumrall||1913||1996||American Pentecostal pastor and evangelist||Spirit, Soul and Body||
|-
| S. Lewis Johnson Jr.||1915||2004||American Presbyterian Theologian||Man and his Nature, part 1||
|-
| Gleason Archer||1916||2004||American theologian||Encyclopedia of Bible Difficulties||
|-
| P. B. Fitzwater||?||?||||Christian Theology A Systematic Presentation||John Woodward
|}

A form of trichotomy is also held in Latter Day Saint theology. In the Doctrine and Covenants, a revelation of Joseph Smith Jr. states: "And the spirit and the body are the soul of man" (D&C 88:15).

See also
 Bipartite (theology)
 Christian anthropology
 Human spirit
 Monism
 Nous Soul dualism

Notes

ReferencesThe Ante-Nicene Fathers. Ed. Alexander Roberts and James Donaldson. Reprint. 10 Vols. Peabody: Hendrickson, 1994.
Alford, Henry. The New Testament for English Readers. 2 Vols. London: Rivingtons, 1872.
Augustine. Confessions: Books I-XIII. Trans. F. J. Sheed. Indianapolis: Hackett Pub., 1993.
Berkhof, Louis. Systematic Theology. Eerdmans, 1996.
Boardman, George D. "The Scriptural Anthropology." Baptist Quarterly Vol. 1 (1867): 177–190, 325–340, 428–444.
Delitzsch, Franz. A System of Biblical Psychology. Trans. Robert E. Wallis. 2nd, English ed. Edinburgh: T. & T. Clark, 1885.
Ellicott, C. J. The Destiny of the Creature. London: Longmans, Green, 1865.
Good, Roger. "The Parts of Man in Translation." Affirmation and Critique II.4 (October 1997).
Good, Roger. "The Progressive Revelation of Man." Affirmation and Critique III.1 (January 1998).
Heard, John Bickford. The Tripartite Nature of Man. 2nd ed. Edinburgh: T. & T. Clark, 1868.
Hendry, George S. The Holy Spirit in Christian Theology. Philadelphia: Westminster, 1956.
Hodge, Charles. Systematic Theology. Ed. Edward N. Gross. Abridged ed. Grand Rapids, MI: Baker Book House, 1992.
"Is Man Tripartite or Bipartite?" Catholic Answers. N.p., n.d. Web. 1 May 2017.
Kelley, John N. D. Early Christian Doctrines. 5th, revised ed. London: Continuum, 1977.
Lang, G. H. Firstfruits and Harvest: A Study in Resurrection and Rapture. Miami Springs, FL: Conley & Schoettle Pub., 1985.
Layton, Richard A. Didymus the Blind and His Circle in Late-antique Alexandria. Urbana: University of Illinois, 2004
Lee, Witness. The Spirit With Our Spirit. Anaheim: Living Stream Ministry, 1994.
Lee, Witness. The Knowledge of Life. 2nd ed. Anaheim: Living Stream Ministry, 1988.
Lubac, Henri De. History and Spirit: The Understanding of Scripture According to Origen. San Francisco: Ignatius, 2007.
Marais, J. I. "Psychology." International Standard Bible Encyclopedia. Grand Rapids: W.B. Eerdmans Pub., 1939.
McDonough, Mary E. God's Plan of Redemption. Bournemouth: Overcomer Book Room, 1922.
Nee, Watchman. The Spiritual Man. New York: Christian Fellowship, 1968.
Oehler, Gust Fr. Theology of the Old Testament. Trans. George Edward Day. 2nd ed. New York: Funk & Wagnalls, 1884.
Pelikan, Jaroslav. The Christian Tradition: A History of the Development of Doctrine, Vol. 1: The Emergence of the Catholic Tradition (100–600). Chicago: University of Chicago, 1971.
Pember, G. H. Earth's Earliest Ages. London: Pickering & Inglis, 1900.
Pester, John. "The Human Spirit in the Experience of the Triune God." Affirmation and Critique I.2 (April 1996).
Pink, Arthur W. Gleanings in Genesis. Paperback ed. Chicago, IL: Moody, 1922.
Scofield, C. I. The New Scofield Reference Bible. New York: Oxford UP, 1967.
Schaff, Philip. History of the Christian Church. Vol 3. Grand Rapids: Eerdmans, 1979.
Stalker, James. Christian Psychology. New York and London: Hodder and Stoughton, 1914.
Strong, Augustus H. Systematic Theology. Valley Forge, PA: Judson, 1907.
Van Oosterzee, Jan Jacob. Christian Dogmatics. London: Hodder & Stoughton, 1874.
Woodward, John B. Man as Spirit, Soul, and Body: A Study of Biblical Psychology''. Pigeon Forge, TN.: Grace Fellowship International, 2007.

External links
 The Tripartite Makeup of Man (wholereason.com)
 Tripartite Man (tripartiteman.org)
 The Collected Works of Watchman Nee
 Doctrine & Covenants 88:15

Christian anthropology